Alejandro Ruiz (born 22 May 1991) is a Caymanian Costa Rican footballer who plays as a midfielder for Elite SC.

International career
He has represented the Cayman Islands during World Cup qualifying matches in 2015.

Honours
George Town SC
Cayman Islands Digicel Cup: 2009–10

Personal life
His brother Andres is also a footballer and a Caymanian international.

References

Caymanian people of Costa Rican descent
Caymanian footballers
Association football midfielders
George Town SC players
Elite SC players
Cayman Islands international footballers
Living people
1991 births
Cayman Islands youth international footballers